The following is a list of individuals associated with Bryn Mawr College through attending as a student, or serving as a member of the faculty or staff.

Noted alumni

Noted faculty and administrators 
 Gerald M. Ackerman, art historian, lecturer in art history (1959-1965)
 Constance Applebee, Director of Athletics (1904-1928). Brought field hockey to the United States from Britain and established women's lacrosse as a collegiate sport.
 Asoka Bandarage
 Florence Bascom, petrologist, founder of Bryn Mawr's Geology Department
 Marland Pratt Billings, Structural Geologist
 Rhys Carpenter, Classical Archaeology (1889-1980)
 Kimberly Wright Cassidy (born ca. 1963), Psychology, ninth president of Bryn Mawr College
 Catherine Conybeare, Professor of Classics
 Maria Luisa Crawford, Geology, MacArthur Genius Grant recipient
 Arthur C. Cope, chemist, developer of the Cope rearrangement and the Cope elimination, namesake of the Arthur C. Cope Award of the American Chemical Society (1934-1941)
 Donald Drew Egbert, Lecturer of Ancient Architecture (1930)
 Louis Fieser, chemist, developer of synthetic napalm, researcher of vitamin K (1925-1930)
 Arthur Lindo Patterson, founder of the Patterson function used in X-ray crystallography (1936-1949)
 Michelle Francl,  computational chemistry
 Louise Holland, academic, philologist and archaeologist
 Alice M. Hoffman, labor and oral historian
 Howard S. Hoffman, Psychology (1925-2006), Behavioral Neuroscientist, leading scholar of the startle reflex and social attachment
 Amy Kelly, headmistress, historian and best-selling author
 Susan Myra Kingsbury, historical economist and social researcher; director of the Social Economy and Social Research department
 Frederica de Laguna, anthropologist and founder of Bryn Mawr's anthropology department (1906–2004)
 Mabel Lang, Greek (1943–1988); received her Ph.D. from Bryn Mawr in 1943
 Agathe Lasch, Germanic philologist (Associate Professor, 1910–16)
 Richmond Lattimore, Greek (1935–1971)
 Bettina Linn (1905–1962), English professor from 1934 to 1962; novelist
 Helen Taft Manning, History (1917–1957), also served as dean
 Berthe Marti, Latin and French (1930–1963)
 Cornelia Meigs, English (1932–1950)
 Agnes Kirsopp Lake Michels, Latin (1934–1975)
 José Ferrater Mora, Philosophy (1949–1980).
 Thomas Hunt Morgan, geneticist and winner of the Nobel Prize in Physiology and Medicine (1866–1946)
 Emmy Noether, Mathematics (1933–1935)
 Jane M. Oppenheimer, Embryology and History of Science (1938-1980)
 John Oxtoby, Mathematics (1939-1979)
 Brunilde Sismondo Ridgway, Archeology (1958-1994) 
 Charlotte Scott, Mathematics (1885–1917)
 Hilda Worthington Smith, labor educator, social worker, and poet (1888-1984)
 Lily Ross Taylor, Latin (1927–1942), Dean of the Graduate School (1942–52)
 M. Carey Thomas, English, Dean of the College (1884–1908), President (1894–1922)
 Edward Warburg (1908-1992), taught Modern Art.
 Harold Wethey, art historian
 Woodrow Wilson, (1885–1888)

Noted fictional alumni 
 Pamela Abbott (A.B.), Inventing the Abbotts (1997), played by Liv Tyler
 C.C. Babcock, The Nanny (1993), played by Lauren Lane
 Erica Barry (A.B.), Something's Gotta Give lead character, played by Diane Keaton
 Amanda Bonner (A.B.), Adam's Rib (1949), played by Katharine Hepburn
Betty Draper (A.B. in Anthropology), Mad Men (2007), played by January Jones
 Nancy Drew & Carolyn Keene, Confessions of a Teen Sleuth (book published in 2005)
Allison R. Hart-Burnett (A.B.) (1980s), Lady Jaye (a fictional character in the G.I. Joe: A Real American Hero toy line)
Edna Krabappel (M.A.), The Simpsons teacher
 Miriam "Midge" Maisel (B.A.), The Marvelous Mrs. Maisel (2017), played by Rachel Brosnahan
 Vivian Schuyler (B.A.),"The Secret Life of Violet Grant" by Beatriz Williams.
 Corinthians (A.B.), "Song of Solomon" (book published 1977)

Notes 

Bryn Mawr College